Global Traveler USA is a monthly AAM-audited magazine published mainly for frequent business and luxury travelers.

History
Global Traveler was founded  by Francis X. Gallagher  in 2004 with its headquarters located in  Yardley, Pennsylvania, USA.

Services
Global Traveler brings its readers information about premium cabins, airlines and  hotels around the world. The magazine also offers different awards to various companies for outstanding performances on annual basis.

References

External links
  

Lifestyle magazines published in the United States
Monthly magazines published in the United States
Magazines established in 2004
Magazines published in Pennsylvania